This is list of mayors of Guelph, Ontario, Canada. Guelph was founded April 23, 1879 and incorporated as a town on January 1, 1856. Guelph officially became a city on April 23, 1879.

Chain of office
Since 1967, each sitting mayor has been honoured and presented with the chain of office to wear during their term of office. It is to be worn at city council meetings and other formal functions. The chain contains 17 shields engraved with subjects of local significance. The chain is also engraved with the names of the mayors who have worn it since it was commissioned.  There are currently seven names of previous mayors engraved on the chain.

List of mayors

Town of Guelph

Notes:

City of Guelph

References

Guelph, Ontario